Maksim Igorevich Zhitnev (born 5 May 1990) is a Russian football striker who plays for Novosibirsk.

Club career
He made his debut in the Russian Second Division for FC Sibir-2 Novosibirsk on 23 April 2011 in a game against FC Kuzbass Kemerovo.

He made his Russian Football National League debut for FC Sibir Novosibirsk on 9 August 2011 in a game against FC Torpedo Moscow.

He was called the player of the month in Football National League in July 2015.

On 29 January 2020, Irtysh Pavlodar announced the signing of Zhitnev.

References

1990 births
People from Belovo, Kemerovo Oblast
Living people
Russian footballers
Association football forwards
FC Sibir Novosibirsk players
FC Kuban Krasnodar players
FC Tom Tomsk players
FC Irtysh Pavlodar players
Kazakhstan Premier League players
Russian expatriate footballers
Expatriate footballers in Kazakhstan
Sportspeople from Kemerovo Oblast